Sept-Rivières (French for "Seven-Rivers") is a regional county municipality of Quebec, Canada, in the Côte-Nord region. Its county seat is Sept-Îles.

The census groups Sept-Rivières RCM with neighbouring Caniapiscau Regional County Municipality RCM into the single census division of Sept-Rivières—Caniapiscau.  In the Canada 2011 Census, the combined population was 39,500.  The population of Sept-Rivières RCM itself was 35,240, of whom the vast majority live in the city of Sept-Îles.

Geography
Sept-Rivières is located in the central part of Côte-Nord. It is bordered by the regional county municipalities of Manicouagan, Caniapiscau, and Minganie, as well as by the southwest corner of Labrador and by the Gulf of Saint Lawrence. It is mostly covered by the Laurentian mountains. It is a very sparsely populated and undeveloped region with its population highly concentrated along the coast, mostly at Sept-Îles (about three-fourths of the population).

It allegedly takes its name  from seven major rivers that join the Saint Lawrence within the territory: Moisie, Sainte-Marguerite, Trinité, Pentecôte, aux Rochers, Pigou and Manitou. But neither the Trinité River nor the Manitou River reaches the Saint Lawrence within the limits of the regional county municipality, and many other rivers could be amongst those "seven rivers".

Subdivisions
There are four subdivisions and two native reserves within the RCM:

Cities & Towns (2)
 Sept-Îles
 Port-Cartier

Unorganized territories (2)
 Rivière-Nipissis
 Lac-Walker

Native Reserves (2)
 Maliotenam
 Uashat

Transportation

Access Routes
Highways and numbered routes that run through the municipality, including external routes that start or finish at the county border:

 Autoroutes
 None

 Principal Highways
 

 Secondary Highways
 None

 External Routes
 None

River basins
There are a number of large rivers that flow in a generally north-south direction through Sept-Rivières to enter the Gulf. Near the coast the river basins tend to narrow in towards the river mouth, and between their mouths are areas that drain into the Gulf through smaller streams. From west to east, the larger river basins, which may cover parts of neighboring regions, are:

See also
 List of regional county municipalities and equivalent territories in Quebec

References